The All-American Basketball Alliance was formed in 1977, with the intention of competing with the established Continental Basketball Association as the premier basketball minor league in the United States. Eight teams competed in the only season of the AABA, which consisted of forty games and ran from January 6, 1978 until February 2, 1978.

Teams

The teams were divided into two divisions, shown below with their win–loss records at the time of dispersion.

North Division

 Rochester Zeniths (10–1)
 Kentucky Stallions (7–5)
 New York Guard (4–5)
 Indiana Wizards (0–8)

South Division

 Carolina Lightning (8–2)
 Georgia Titans (5–3)
 Richmord Virginians (3–8)
 West Virginia Wheels (3–8)

The Zeniths, with the best record in the league, went on to join the established Continental Basketball Association (CBA), which they won twice. Eddie Owens of the Zeniths scored the most points in the league with 282, while the Stallions' Bobby Wilson netted the most points per game with 26.6.

A number of phantom franchises were also signed up for the Alliance, but never actually played a game; these were:

 Alabama Aces
 Baton Rouge
 Carolina Dragons
 Indiana Impalas
 Massachusetts Rifles
 New York Greyhounds
 Ohio Orbits
 Rhode Island Devils
 Springfield
 Toronto
 Virginia Sailors

References

 History of the All-America Basketball Alliance, from apbr.org, contributed by John Duxbury and Shawn Oliver, retrieved February 1, 2006
 All-American Basketball Alliance 2004 from logoserver.com, retrieved February 1, 2006

1977–78 in American basketball by league
1978 disestablishments in the United States
Defunct basketball leagues in the United States